Flame {stylized as FLAME) was a Japanese boy band formed in 2001 by Vision Factory. On March 1, 2010, they disbanded.

Career
Flame debuted in 2001 with their single "Mune no Kodō." Prior to debut, all four members had participated in the Junon Super Boy Contest. The group steadily released singles until their first album was released in late 2002 after four singles. A fifth single followed that in March 2003, but it was a different image and sound for the boy band. After their sixth single, "Venus", their releases became sporadic. In 2004, Kaneko left Flame to pursue a solo career. Seigo Noguchi was announced as a new member during Flame's fan club meeting on December 24, 2004, along with "Shake You Down" releasing as a new single on February 16, 2005. On March 1, 2010, Flame announced through their official website that they were disbanding.

3 years after disbandment, on March 1, 2013, all five former members of Flame announced they were forming a new group, Emalf. Emalf later disbanded on November 27, 2015.

Members

Discography

Studio albums

Singles

VHS/DVD 
[2002.12.18] Boys' Box
[2003.03.19] Boys' Step
[2003.09.03] Boys' Box 2

References

Japanese boy bands
Japanese idol groups
Japanese pop music groups
Musical groups established in 2001
Musical groups disestablished in 2010
Musical groups from Tokyo
Pony Canyon artists